Constrained comics is a form of comics that places some fundamental constraint on form beyond those inherent to the medium. By adding a constraint, the artist is attempting to produce original art within tightly defined boundaries.

A conceptually similar movement is the constrained writing movement, where writers have attempted to do things such as write novels in palindromic form or without the letter "e". Poetry is sometimes constrained into specific rhyme and meter categories such as haiku or sonnet.

Examples
Notable examples of constrained comics:
 Gustave Verbeek's The Upside Downs of Little Lady Lovekins and Old Man Muffaroo, a weekly 6-panel comic strip in which the first half of the story was illustrated and captioned right-side-up, then the reader would turn the page up-side-down, and the inverted illustrations with additional captions describing the scenes told the second half of the story, for a total of 12 panels.
 The Angriest Dog in the World a comic strip by David Lynch. Each four-panel comic has identical artwork. The only change between each comic is the dialogue in the first three panels.
 Dinosaur Comics which uses the same artwork, with only dialogue changing.
 Watchmen is created with a number of formal constraints; issue #5 in particular, entitled "Fearful Symmetry", follows a palindromic structure.
 Partially Clips which uses three identical panels based on clipart.
 The many works of the Oubapo group.
 Matt Madden's 99 Ways to Tell a Story.
 Garfield Minus Garfield, which features the comic character Jon Arbuckle without the titular cat, who has been digitally removed from the otherwise untouched comic.

See also
 Infinite canvas, a movement in comics in a sense opposite to that of constrained comics

Further reading
 Baetens, Jan. Comic Strips and Constrained Writing. Image & Narrative. Issue 7. October 2003. Retrieved on 2008-09-24.

External links
 Article about constraint on ComixTalk

Comics terminology